Rayan Kabanga Kadima Mpata (born 15 December 1997) is a French professional footballer who plays as a centre-back for Swiss club Lausanne Ouchy.

Professional career
Kadima made his professional debut for AC Ajaccio in a 0–0 Ligue 2 draw with Chamois Niortais on 28 July 2017.

On 17 June 2021, he signed with Lausanne Ouchy.

Personal life
Kadima is of Congolese descent.

References

External links
 
 

1997 births
Living people
People from Ermont
Footballers from Val-d'Oise
French footballers
Association football central defenders
Association football midfielders
AC Ajaccio players
AO Chania F.C. players
FC Stade Nyonnais players
FC Stade Lausanne Ouchy players
Championnat National 3 players
Ligue 2 players
Football League (Greece) players
Swiss Promotion League players
Swiss Challenge League players
French expatriate footballers
French expatriate sportspeople in Greece
Expatriate footballers in Greece
French expatriate sportspeople in Switzerland
Expatriate footballers in Switzerland
French sportspeople of Central African Republic descent
French sportspeople of Democratic Republic of the Congo descent
Black French sportspeople